C More Max is a Finnish pay television channel owned and operated by MTV Oy. The channel started broadcasting in November 2006 and was originally dedicated to F1 coverage.

History

As MTV3+ 
In November 2002, MTV3 announced the launch of a digital-only channel named MTV3+ focusing mobile games and soap opera re-runs. They were granted a terrestrial minilicense and most of Finland's cable operators carried it.

The channel got a full license in January 2004 and with its possibilities, Formula 1, ice hockey's SM-liiga, Finnish Floorball League, boxing, ski jumping, alpine skiing and some other sports broadcasts were added to the channel's programming. But at the same time, the channel partially turned into a pay-TV channel with a one-time fee of €20 (for Formula 1 & SM-liiga, there was also an extra fee of €70 each). MTV3 used the old minilicense of MTV3+ to create another channel, MTV3+ Extra, which showed overtime periods of SM-liiga matches.

The channel did not focus solely on sports: movies, court sessions and live coverage of reality series were added, while the most notable broadcast was the Tony Halme drug trial in 2004.

Relaunch as MTV3 Max 

On 1 November 2006, 4 years from the channel's beginning, MTV3+ was quit with a very small notice of 28 hours. The channel got replaced by four new pay-TV channels, MTV3 MAX, MTV3 Fakta, Sub Leffa and Sub Juniori.

Sports programming

Motorsports 
Formula One
GP2
GP3
Top Gear
Documentaries branded as MAX.doc
MotoGP
Moto2
Moto3

Ice hockey 
Ice Hockey World Championships

Ski sports 
FIS Cross-Country World Cup
FIS Ski Jumping World Cup
FIS Nordic Combined World Cup
FIS Alpine Ski World Cup

Other programming

Talk shows 
The Tonight Show with Jay Leno
Late Show with David Letterman

Comedy 
The Office
The Benny Hill Show

Reality 
Dhani Tackles the Globe
Hell's Kitchen
Scrapheap Challenge

Fictional 
24

MTV3's Formula One Team 
 Niki Juusela - Current race commentary for live broadcasts from 2017.
 Oskari Saari - Race commentary for live broadcasts from 2004 to 2016. Matti Kyllönen has previously provided commentary for the hour-long race summary shown on MTV3.
 Erkki Mustakari - Reporter and interviewer as well as occasional co-commentator with Saari (such as replacing Jyrki Järvilehto in 2010).
 Mervi Kallio - On-track reporter and interviewer for races. Also occasional commentator for Friday practice sessions.
 Mika Salo - Saari's new co-commentator in 2011.
 Ossi Oikarinen - co-commentator since 2013.
 Toni Vilander - co-commentator since 2014.

MTV3's Ice Hockey team 
Antero Mertaranta - Commentator, he commentary every Finnish hockey team game.
Mika Saukkonen - Commentator.
Juha Taivainen - Commentator
Juhani Tamminen - Co-commentator.
Hannu Aravirta - Co-commentator.
Pasi Nurminen - Co-commentator.
Tero Lehterä - Co-commentator.
Teemu Niikko - Reporter.
Toni Immonen - Reporter.

MTV3's Ski sports team

Cross-Country
Antero Mertaranta - Commentator.
Toni Roponen - Co-commentator.

Ski jumping
Jani Uotila - Commentator.
Toni Nieminen - Co-commentator.

Nordic combined
Mika Saukkonen - Commentator.
Jani Rajalin - Commentator.
Hannu Manninen - Co-commentator.

Alpine skiing
Antti Haajanen - Commentator.
Sami Uotila - Co-commentator.

MTV3's MotoGP team
Marko Terva-aho - Commentator.
Mika Kallio - Co-commentator.
Matti Kiiveri - Co-commentator.
Vesa Kallio - Co-commentator.

References 

Television channels in Finland
Television channels and stations established in 2006
Bonnier Group